The Tasmanian Transport Museum is a museum located in Glenorchy, Tasmania, preserving and exhibiting a collection relating to Tasmanian transport history including items such as locomotives, carriages, ephemera and railroadiana.

History
In 1960, the Metropolitan Transport Trust donated a Hobart tramcar to be preserved, and as a result the Tasmanian Transport Museum Society was founded in 1962, with the aim of preserving representative items of transport interest that were disappearing from everyday life.

The first decade of the Society's existence saw the preservation of many items that had been donated or purchased, and it was not until 1972 that a site adjacent to the railway station in Glenorchy was leased from the Glenorchy City Council. After the laying of track, the first items were moved there in 1976.

After this time, the museum prospered in building on the site, with an electric traction shed built in 1976, as well as the Steam Technology building in 1983, a carriage shed in 1984 and a roundhouse in 1986. The most recent additions to the museum include a Fire Services shed completed in 2004, and a Road Transport shed completed in 2013.

In 1979, after the cessation of passenger train services in Tasmania, the Museum purchased and moved the former New Town railway station building to the site in sections, and this was completed in 1980. The Museum also acquired a railway turntable from Brighton and a signal cabin from the Botanical Gardens railway halt.

The Society has steadily acquired an extensive array of exhibits, relics, models and photographs, that portray many facets of the history of Tasmanian transport. Society members also have carried out much of the development work on exhibits and the site, with the State Government being the major financial contributor for capital works, however; membership is small and the Society relys mainly on volunteers, due to the financial and time constraints on the museum.

Exhibits
All items from this list were attained from

Railway locomotives

Railmotors

Engineering heritage award 
The museum collection received an Engineering Heritage Marker from Engineers Australia as part of its Engineering Heritage Recognition Program.

See also 
 List of transport museums
 List of museums in Tasmania

Notes 

Museums in Hobart
Steam museums in Australia
Transport museums in Tasmania
Glenorchy, Tasmania
Recipients of Engineers Australia engineering heritage markers